Contemporary fantasy, also known as modern fantasy, is a subgenre of fantasy, set in the present day or, more accurately, the time period of the maker. It is perhaps most popular for its subgenre, urban fantasy.

Strictly, supernatural fiction can be said to be part of contemporary fantasy since it has fantasy elements and is set in a contemporary setting. In practice, however, supernatural fiction is a well-established genre in its own right, with its own distinctive conventions.

Definition and overview

These terms are used to describe stories set in the putative real world (often referred to as consensus reality) in contemporary times, in which magic and magical creatures exist but are not commonly seen or understood as such, either living in the interstices of our world or leaking over from alternate worlds. It thus has much in common with, and sometimes overlaps with secret history; a work of fantasy in which the magic could not remain secret, or does not have any known relationship to known history, would not fit into this subgenre.

Novels in which modern characters travel into alternative worlds, and all the magical action takes place there (except for the portal required to transport them), are not considered contemporary fantasy. Thus, C.S. Lewis's The Lion, the Witch and the Wardrobe, where all fantasy events take place in the land of Narnia which is reached via a magic wardrobe, would not count as contemporary fantasy; on the other hand, the part of The Magician's Nephew, where the Empress Jadis gets to London, tries to take over the Earth and clashes with police and a crowd of cockneys, would qualify as such.

Contemporary fantasy is generally distinguished from horror fiction – which also often has contemporary settings and fantastic elements – by the overall tone, emphasizing joy or wonder rather than fear or dread.

In his preface to That Hideous Strength, one of the earlier works falling within this subgenre, C.S. Lewis explained why, when writing a tale about "magicians, devils, pantomime animals and planetary angels", he chose to start it with a detailed depiction of narrow-minded academic politics at a provincial English university and the schemes of crooked real estate developers: "I am following the traditional fairy-tale. We do not always notice its method, because the cottages, castles, woodcutters and petty kings with which a fairy tale opens have become for us as remote as the witches and ogres to which it proceeds. But they were not remote at all to the men who first made and enjoyed the tales". The same is true for many of the later works in the genre, which often begin with a seemingly normal scene of modern daily life to then disclose supernatural and magical beings and events hidden behind the scenes.

Subgenres
Contemporary fantasies often concern places dear to their authors, are full of local color and atmosphere, and attempt to lend a sense of magic to those places, particularly when the subgenre overlaps with mythic fiction.

When the story takes place in a city, the work is often called urban fantasy.

The contemporary fantasy and low fantasy genres can overlap as both are defined as being set in the real world.  There are differences, however.  Low fantasies are set in the real world but not necessarily in the modern age, in which case they would not be contemporary fantasy.  Contemporary fantasies are set in the real world but may also include distinct fantasy settings within it, such as the Harry Potter series, in which case they would be high rather than low fantasy.

Related to Contemporary fantasy are fantasies set in fictional worlds, with their own distinct history and culture, but in which magic coexists with modern technology - rather than being set in a quasi-medieval setting, as were most earlier Fantasy works. For example, at the climax of L.E. Modesitt's The Death of Chaos, powerful magicians engage in a titanic battle and destroy a vast fleet of WWI-type Dreadnaughts, foiling the expansionist plans of a militarist Emperor loosely modeled on Kaiser Wilhelm of Imperial Germany.

Examples

19th and early 20th centuries

Erich Kästner The 35th of May, or Conrad's Ride to the South Seas
 Robert Louis Stevenson: The Bottle Imp
 Jack Williamson: Darker Than You Think
 William T. Cox, Fearsome Creatures of the Lumberwoods
 Denis Wheatley's Gregory Sallust series, pitting the protagonist against supernatural forces on the background of WWII and Nazi Germany.
 Stella Benson: Living Alone 
 Edith Nesbit: The Magic City, Psammead series, House of Arden series, The Enchanted Castle, The Magic World and other works
 Stefan Grabiński: Salamandra (Salamander)
 Edward Eager: The Magic Series
 Janusz Korczak, Kaytek the Wizard 
 P. L. Travers: Mary Poppins
 Mikhail Bulgakov: The Master and Margarita
 Rudyard Kipling, Puck of Pook's Hill
 C.S.Lewis: That Hideous Strength
 Hendrik Willem van Loon: Van Loon's Lives
 Selma Lagerlöf: The Wonderful Adventures of Nils (orig. Nils Holgerssons underbara resa genom Sverige)
 H. G. Wells: The Wonderful Visit, The Sea Lady and The Man Who Could Work Miracles
 Charles Williams: An early innovator of theology-oriented contemporary fantasy.

Later 20th and early 21st centuries

Freda Warrington's Aetherial Tales series
 Benedict Jacka's Alex Verus series
 Eoin Colfer's Artemis Fowl series
 Ryohgo Narita's Baccano! (in part) and Durarara!!
 Tite Kubo's Bleach
 Mary Norton's The Borrowers
 Joss Whedon's Buffyverse
 Kazuma Kamachi's A Certain Magical Index
 Virtually the entire oeuvre of Charles de Lint
 Dangerous Angels and other works by Francesca Lia Block
 Constance M. Burge's Charmed
 Dark Cities Underground by Lisa Goldstein
 Susan Cooper's The Dark Is Rising Sequence
 Tom Deitz's The David Sullivan series
 Hazel Butler's Deathly Insanity series.
 Jenna Black's The Devil Inside, set in the United States with demons.
 The Dresden Files series by Jim Butcher
 Raymond E. Feist's Faerie Tale
 Type-Moon's The Garden of Sinners, Tsukihime, and Fate series which takes place in a world where magic has all but vanished as technology has overtaken it and all the gods and magical creatures have either disappeared or simply left.
 Peter S. Beagle's A Fine and Private Place and other works by him.
 Richelle Mead's Georgina Kincaid series
 Midori Snyder's Hannah's Garden
 J.K. Rowling's Harry Potter series - set in the United Kingdom during the 1990s, with flashbacks to the 1920s, 1930s, 1940s, 1970s, and 1980s, and flash-forwards to the 2010s. Harry Potter and the Cursed Child is set during the 2020s, with flashbacks to the 1980s, 1990s, and 2010s. Alternately, J.K. Rowling's Fantastic Beasts series of screenplays, takes place in a number of global locations, throughout the 1920s, '30s, and ending in 1945.
 Kouta Hirano's Hellsing
 Philip Pullman's His Dark Materials trilogy - The trilogy takes place across several universes including "ours".
 Hirohiko Araki's JoJo's Bizarre Adventure (Stardust Crusaders, Diamond Is Unbreakable, Golden Wind, Stone Ocean, and JoJolion) - Phantom Blood and Steel Ball Run take place in the late 19th century, while Battle Tendency takes place in the late 1930s; and with the exception of Stardust Crusaders and JoJolion, each series takes place in a near future relative to its original publishing date.
 China Miéville's King Rat
 Little, Big and other works by John Crowley
 Lev Grossman's The Magicians series
 Various works by Mercedes Lackey.
 Minions of the Moon by Richard Bowes
 Boris and Arkady Strugatsky's "Monday Begins on Saturday", where magic and characters from Russian myth exist in the Soviet Union of the time of writing.
 Nisio Isin's Monogatari series.
 A number of works by Neil Gaiman, among them American Gods  and Neverwhere, set in a secondary world below London with links to the real world.
 Sergei Lukyanenko's Night Watch, set in Moscow. It has three sequels that form a tetralogy; Day Watch, Twilight Watch and Final Watch.
 Natasha Mostert's The Other Side of Silence and Season of the Witch
 Rick Riordan's Percy Jackson & the Olympians, Heroes of Olympus, The Kane Chronicles, Magnus Chase and the Gods of Asgard, and The Trials of Apollo series.
 Richard Kadrey's Sandman Slim series
 Derek Landy's Skulduggery Pleasant (series)
 Josepha Sherman's Son of Darkness
 Charlaine Harris' The Southern Vampire Mysteries and its television adaption, True Blood
 Eric Kripke's Supernatural
 Various works by Tanya Huff.
 Most of the novels of Tim Powers
 Tithe: A Modern Faerie Tale and a number of other works by Holly Black
 Sui Ishida's Tokyo Ghoul
 Stephenie Meyer's Twilight Saga
 Isaac Asimov's "The Two-Centimeter Demon" and other stories involving the tiny demon Azazel.
 L. J. Smith's The Vampire Diaries (novel series) and its television adaption
 P.N. Elrod's Vampire Files series following Jack Fleming a vampire P.I.
 Emma Bull's War for the Oaks
 Clive Barker's Weaveworld and Imajica
 Tony Vilgotsky's Chronicles of Skharn and Shepherd of the Dead
 W.I.T.C.H. a comic series by Elisabetta Gnone, Alessandro Barbucci, and Barbara Canepa.
 Kelley Armstrong's Women of the Otherworld series
 Terri Windling's The Wood Wife
 Terry Brooks' Word/Void novels
 Diane Duane's Young Wizards - the protagonists live in Manhattan, New York, but each book in the series has a different setting; settings include various planets within and outside of the Solar System and various alternative universes.
 Ysabel by Guy Gavriel Kay mostly set in 21st-century Aix-en-Provence
 Yoshihiro Togashi's Yu Yu Hakusho
 P. B. Kerr' Children of the Lamp
 Oh Seong-dae's Tales of the Unusual

Overlap with other genres
Contemporary fantasy can also be found marketed as mainstream or literary fiction and frequently marketed as magical realism, itself arguably a fantasy genre. Examples include Practical Magic by Alice Hoffman, The Antelope Wife by Louise Erdrich, and Mistress of Spices by Chitra Bannerjee Divakaruni.

See also
 List of genres

References 

 Martin Horstkotte, The postmodern fantastic in contemporary British fiction. WVT, Trier 2004, 
 Lance Olsen, Ellipse of uncertainty : an introduction to postmodern fantasy. Greenwood Press, Westport 1987,

External links 
 

 
Fantasy genres